Quentalia drepanoides is a moth in the family Bombycidae. It was described by Francis Walker in 1866. It is found from Mexico, Honduras and Guatemala to Colombia.

References

Bombycidae
Moths described in 1866